Elections to Ballymena Borough Council were held on 7 June 2001 on the same day as the other Northern Irish local government elections. The election used four district electoral areas to elect a total of 24 councillors.

Election results

Note: "Votes" are the first preference votes.

Districts summary

|- class="unsortable" align="centre"
!rowspan=2 align="left"|Ward
! % 
!Cllrs
! % 
!Cllrs
! %
!Cllrs
! %
!Cllrs
!rowspan=2|TotalCllrs
|- class="unsortable" align="center"
!colspan=2 bgcolor="" | DUP
!colspan=2 bgcolor="" | UUP
!colspan=2 bgcolor="" | SDLP
!colspan=2 bgcolor="white"| Others
|-
|align="left"|Ballymena North
|bgcolor="#D46A4C"|27.7
|bgcolor="#D46A4C"|2
|24.8
|2
|13.8
|1
|33.7
|2
|7
|-
|align="left"|Ballymena South
|bgcolor="#D46A4C"|55.8
|bgcolor="#D46A4C"|4
|22.1
|2
|17.3
|1
|4.8
|0
|7
|-
|align="left"|Bannside
|bgcolor="#D46A4C"|55.2
|bgcolor="#D46A4C"|3
|24.0
|1
|17.6
|1
|3.2
|0
|5
|-
|align="left"|Braid
|bgcolor="#D46A4C"|41.8
|bgcolor="#D46A4C"|2
|40.3
|2
|17.5
|1
|0.4
|0
|5
|-
|- class="unsortable" class="sortbottom" style="background:#C9C9C9"
|align="left"| Total
|44.9
|11
|27.5
|7
|16.5
|4
|11.1
|2
|24
|-
|}

Districts results

Ballymena North

1997: 3 x UUP, 2 x DUP, 1 x SDLP, 1 x Alliance, 1 x Independent Unionist
2001: 2 x DUP, 2 x UUP, 2 x Independent, 1 x SDLP
1997-2001 Change: DUP gain from Alliance, Independent leaves UUP and Independent Unionist becomes Independent

Ballymena South

1997 3 x DUP, 3 x UUP, 1 x SDLP
2001 4 x DUP, 2 x UUP, 1 x SDLP
1997-2001 Change: DUP gain from UUP

Bannside

1997: 3 x DUP, 2 x UUP
2001: 3 x DUP, 1 x UUP, 1 x SDLP
1997-2001 Change: SDLP gain from UUP

Braid

1997: 3 x UUP, 1 x DUP, 1 x SDLP
2001: 2 x DUP, 2 x UUP, 1 x SDLP
1997-2001 Change: DUP gain from UUP

References

Ballymena Borough Council elections
Ballymena